Leanne Leggieri is a former Australian cricketer. She played two List A matches for Victoria during the 1997–98 season of the Women's National Cricket League (WNCL).

References

External links
 

Year of birth missing (living people)
Place of birth missing (living people)
Living people
Australian cricketers
Australian women cricketers
Victoria women cricketers